Peter D. Walter House is a historic home located at Lockport in Niagara County, New York.  It is a two-story stone structure built in 1858 by Peter D. Walter, seventh mayor of Lockport, in the Italianate style. It is one of approximately 75 stone residences remaining in the city of Lockport.

It was listed on the National Register of Historic Places in 2007.

References

External links
Walter, Peter D., House - Lockport, NY - U.S. National Register of Historic Places on Waymarking.com

Houses on the National Register of Historic Places in New York (state)
Italianate architecture in New York (state)
Houses completed in 1858
Houses in Niagara County, New York
National Register of Historic Places in Niagara County, New York
1858 establishments in New York (state)